Middletown  was a hamlet in the Town of Orangetown, Rockland County, New York, United States, located north of Nauraushaun; east of the state of New Jersey; south of Nanuet and west of Blauvelt.

History
In the early 1870s, Pearl River was divided into five different sections: Sickletown, Nauraushaun, Middletown, Pascack and Muddy Brook.

Books and publications
Green, Frank Bertangue. MD, The History of Rockland County:

External links

Former populated places in Rockland County, New York
Hamlets in Rockland County, New York